Genius + Love = Yo La Tengo is a 2-disc album by Yo La Tengo, consisting of rarities, alternate versions, and out-takes, spanning 1988 to 1995. The album was released on Matador in 1996; a Japanese version with two extra tracks appeared in 1998.

The title is a pun on the 1960 Ray Charles album, Genius+Soul=Jazz.  ("The Genius" was Charles' nickname.)

The first disc contains songs with vocals.  There are several cover songs, such as John Cale's "Hanky Panky Nohow," The Velvet Underground's "I'm Set Free," Beat Happening's "Cast A Shadow," and Wire's "Too Late." The cover of Daniel Johnston's "Speeding Motorcycle" features Johnston calling in his vocals to the song via telephone.  "Demons" originally appeared on the soundtrack to the 1995 film I Shot Andy Warhol (in which YLT appeared as a Velvet Underground-esque band).

The second disc consists entirely of instrumental pieces.  Included are songs previously recorded by the group (such as an 8-second drum solo), and covers, such as The Urinals' "Surfin' With The Shah," and a wedding-band-like rendition of the Ramones' "Blitzkrieg Bop."  "Sunsquashed" is a 26-minute psychedelic jam, from which one of the band's main fansites took its name.

Track listing

Disc 1
"Evanescent Psychic Pez Drop" – 2:48
"Demons" – 3:18
"Fog Over Frisco" – 3:47
"Too Late" (Wire) – 5:57
"Hanky Panky Nohow" (John Cale) – 2:58
"Something To Do" – 2:11
"Ultra-Powerful Short Wave Radio Picks Up Music From Venus" (feat. Jad Fair - written by David Fair and Yo La Tengo) – 1:31
"Up To You" – 4:03
"Somebody's Baby" (Jackson Browne, Danny Kortchmar) – 3:38
"Walking Away From You" – 5:58
"Artificial Heart" (Ernest Noyes Brookings, Kaplan) – 3:00
"Cast A Shadow" (Beat Happening) – 2:24
"I'm Set Free" (The Velvet Underground cover) – 4:10
"Barnaby, Hardly Working" – 3:54
"Some Kinda Fatigue" – 7:38
"Speeding Motorcycle" (feat. and written by Daniel Johnston) – 3:33

Disc 2
"Nutricia" – 5:01
"Her Grandmother's Gift" – 2:39
"From A Motel 6, Pt. 2" – 4:29
"Gooseneck Problem" – 0:04
"Surfin' With The Shah" (Urinals) – 2:07
"Ecstasy Blues" – 2:47
"Too Much, Pt. 1" – 1:18
"Blitzkrieg Bop" (Ramones)– 2:18
"One Self: Fish Girl" – 5:31
"Enough" – 5:25
"Drum Solo" – 0:08
"From A Motel 6, Pt. 1" – 3:35
"Too Much, Pt. 2" – 0:21
"Sunsquashed" – 26:22

References

External links
 Album details at Sunsquashed.com
 Yo La Tengo band site
 Matador Records' official YLT page

Yo La Tengo albums
1996 compilation albums
Matador Records compilation albums